Trupanea aira is a species of tephritid or fruit flies in the genus Trupanea of the family Tephritidae.

Distribution
Cameroon, Congo, Burundi, Tanzania.

References

Tephritinae
Insects described in 1849
Diptera of Africa